The Cat Lady is a 2012 horror graphic adventure game developed by Harvester Games for Microsoft Windows and Linux. It is the second installment in the Devil Came Through Here trilogy after 2009's Downfall. The final installment, titled Lorelai, was released in 2019.

Overview 

The game is a puzzle-based adventure game. The game is entirely played using only the four arrow keys, with the ESC key being used to access the Save/Load menu. Because of this highly simplified control scheme, characters can only move left and right between scenes while up and down are used to interact with objects in the environment and the player's inventory, respectively. All character dialogue is fully voiced and the cut-scenes cannot be skipped. The player can occasionally make dialogue decisions that alter the story slightly, and some story scenes are told out of order.

The ending changes slightly depending on the player's dialogue choices. The game deals with mature themes such as depression, suicide, murder and cancer, but also provides moments of humor.

Plot 

The story takes place in the mid-2000s. The protagonist is Susan Ashworth, a chronically depressed, middle-aged woman with no friends. She hates flowers, and her only companions are stray cats, whom she summons to her flat by playing her piano. She is known in her neighborhood as the cat lady.

One night, Susan decides to take her own life, but this leads her to explore a strange place in death where she encounters the Queen of Maggots, who grants her immortality and gives her the task of ridding the world of five psychopaths referred to as the "parasites".

Susan then returns to the world of the living to wake up in a hospital bed and is soon forced to carry out her task. She meets Liz in the hospital, a friendly nurse unhappy with her job, who tells Susan her "daughter" saved her; much to the shock of Susan, who has no daughter. Annoyed by the hospital's constant druggings, Susan attempts to escape, only to be stopped by Doctor X – the hospitals' psychiatrist. She reveals her feelings and past to Doctor X, the details of which can vary depending on the player's dialogue choices. Susan then reveals that she's aware that Liz had died last night, apparently from suicide. For this revelation, Doctor X decides to kill Susan, having actually been responsible for Liz's death. She awakens later in some kind of hidden torture basement to the screams of another victim. She discovers that Doctor X kills his female patients to reform them as artwork, and discovers Liz's corpse among the victims. Susan kills Doctor X, either with a makeshift spear or mace, frees his prisoner, and leaves.

She returns to her flat, attempting to return to her normal life, where she can summon the neighborhood cats by playing the piano. While summoning the cats, she receives an angry complaint from a neighbor, who threatens to call pest control. After this, she meets Mitzi, a young, homeless woman willing to be her new roommate. She had lied about being Susan's daughter merely to save her life. When Susan sees the Queen of Maggots behind Mitzi, she realizes she is close to death, leading Mitzi to reveal her terminal cancer. Mitzi reveals that she had a boyfriend named Jack who was driven to depression upon learning of her cancer. He stumbled upon a suicide forum online, in which a troll called the "Eye of Adam" lured people to committing suicide using a mixture of two household chemicals. Jack has attempted to persuade her into it, though Mitzi had refused, leaving Jack to kill himself. Mitzi insists that she just wants to find the person responsible for Jack's death, who is in one of the building's flats, and talk with them before she dies. Soon after, Susan goes outside to investigate why the cats are howling, only to be kidnapped by the pest controller.

Susan awakes in the pest controllers' house, tied to a table. The man and his wife reveal themselves as cannibals who live off of the women the former kidnaps and the animals they capture on the job. The wife pours bleach down Susan's face to blind her and the man provides Susan with a gun as an act of mercy. Taking advantage of her immortality, Susan kills herself to be fully restored with her eyesight, and proceeds to kill the couple before escaping.

Upon returning to the flat, Susan and Mitzi slowly reconcile and become friends, and Susan agrees to help Mitzi find the Eye of Adam. When having coffee, Mitzi presses Susan about her past, but this upsets Susan. Susan then answers a knock at the door, only to be attacked by a mute intruder who knocks her out and takes both her and Mitzi hostage. The two awaken in the bathroom, bounded together by duct tape. While trapped, Susan reveals her backstory; ten years ago, she was young mother to Zoe, married to a taxi driver named Eric, but also had an unnamed admirer who regularly called her and sent her flowers while Eric was working. Susan normally threw out the flowers her admirer had sent, but this one time found the flowers too beautiful to toss and thus put the flowers in Zoe's room to avoid raising her husband's suspicions. Eric returned home early that day, severely distressed by his near-death experience from a terrorist bombing. Because of Susan's chats with her admirer, she had missed Eric's multiple calls, further upsetting Eric and causing the two to argue. While Eric and Susan's fight escalated, Zoe began choking due to her unknown but severe allergy to pollen from the new flowers. Zoe died, and Eric ran off. Eric would later be found dead in the woods from alcohol poisoning, leaving Susan alone and guilt-ridden in the same flat ever since.

After Susan finishes her story, the mute intruder returns. He threatens to hang Mitzi unless Susan plays the piano for him. She does, and the summoned cats promptly kill the intruder. After cleaning up the mess, Susan decides to help Mitzi find the "Eye of Adam". After eliminating all of the building's tenants as potential suspects, Mitzi and Susan are invited into Flat 5 directly by Eye of Adam through a note on their door. Having previously written off the old man who occupies Flat 5 as senile and backwards, the old man reveals that Eye of Adam is his son, and that he is aware of Adam's plan to kill Mitzi and Susan. However, the old man claims that he will no longer be complicit in his son's activities and attempts to save the two by giving up his gas mask to them, as Adam intends to kill using the same deadly gas concoction that killed Jack. Depending on the player's choices, either Susan or Mitzi can take the mask. In either scenario, the old man dies from the gas trap. If Susan takes the mask, Mitzi will die and Susan will confront Adam alone. If the mask is given to Mitzi, Susan's immortality allows her to return to life and the two proceed to confront Adam together.

Adam is revealed to be a near-helpless man, wheelchair bound, fully paralyzed, and surrounded by volatile gas tanks to assist his breathing. He is only capable of communicating through movements with his left eye, which is attached to a controller that translate those movements to a visual keyboard, explaining his online handle namesake. If Mitzi is alive, she will draw a gun on him with the intent of taking revenge, and the player has the option of talking her down. If only Susan is alive, she will monologue to Adam briefly about him being her last parasite before deciding whether or not to kill him.

If Mitzi is talked down, the two will shut off Adam's computer and leave. Mitzi lives out her remaining days in peace as Susan's tenant. If the player allows Mitzi to kill Adam, Mitzi will fire her gun at point blank and the resulting explosion from the gas tanks will kill Mitzi and Adam. If only Susan survives and chooses to let Adam live, she'll shut off Adam's computer and leaves. If she instead chooses to kill Adam, she will flick a lit cigarette into Adam's room, and let the delayed explosion kill him. Regardless of the player's choices, after laying Mitzi to rest, Susan begins to open up to other people again by writing a blog about her journey through depression and suicide, and begins to actively communicate with others suffering similar problems.

Cast 
The game has English-only voice acting.
 Lynsey Frost as Susan Ashworth – a middle aged widowed cat lady who suffers from depression following the deaths of her infant daughter and husband but slowly comes around to dealing with her past over the course of the game.
 Brittany Morgan Williams as Mitzi Hunt – an energetic, tech-savvy, but terminally ill, young woman who moves in with Susan in her quest for revenge against the online troll responsible for taking her boyfriend's life.
 Klemens Koehring as Doctor X / Eric Ashworth – Doctor X is the resident hospital psychiatrist who is also a serial killer targeting women to be reformed as his "artwork". Eric Ashworth is Susan's late husband who died from alcohol poisoning shortly after their daughter's death.
 David Firth as Pest Controller / His Wife – a cannibal couple who regularly kidnap women and eat their bodies.
 Jesse Gunn as Joe Davis, Susan's schizophrenic neighbor who tortures his wife in secret.
 Pete Bucknall as Bryan, Susan's hostile and unsympathetic neighbor.
 Margaret Cowen as Queen of Maggots – the personification of death Susan sees after her attempt at suicide, representing Susan's self-loathing but also a chance at recovery.
 Alex Sinclair as Doctor
 Dave Seaman as Jesse
 Marianne Miller as Nurse
 Mark Lovegrove as Police Phone Operator
 Remigiusz Michalski as Crow / Ivy Davis

Reception 

The Cat Lady received generally favorable reviews. It received an aggregated score of 81/100 based on 11 reviews on Metacritic. Kevin VanOrd of GameSpot gave the game a very positive review, and concluded it by saying, "If you seek horror, The Cat Lady may sometimes freak you out, though probably not outright scare you. But that horror is in service of a touching character portrait—a portrait that's authentically, poignantly askew." The game won "Best Story" in the 2012 Aggie Awards.

References

External links 

2012 video games
2010s horror video games
Adventure games
Fiction about death
Adventure Game Studio games
Indie video games
Linux games
Video games developed in Poland
Windows games
AGS Award winners
Video games about cats
Video games about mental health
Video games with alternate endings
Video games featuring female protagonists
Video games about suicide